Pisania pusio is a species of sea snail, a marine gastropod mollusk in the family Pisaniidae.

Description
The size of the shell varies between 19 mm and 51 mm. The color of the shell is chocolate or purplish, with revolving series of red-brown arrowheaded markings. The interior of the aperture is bluish . The columella and the edge of the outer lip has a fawn color. There is usually a white central band on the body.

Distribution
This species occurs in the Gulf of Mexico, the Caribbean Sea and off the Lesser Antilles; in the Atlantic Ocean off Ascension Island, the Bermudas and Eastern Brasil.

References

 Finet Y. & Snyder M.A. (2012). Illustrations and taxonomic placement of the Recent Fusus and Fasciolaria in the Lamarck collection of the Muséum d’Histoire Naturelle, Geneva (Caenogastropoda, Buccinoidea, Gastropoda). Zootaxa. 3507: 1–37.page(s): fig. 13

External links
 
  Rosenberg, G.; Moretzsohn, F.; García, E. F. (2009). Gastropoda (Mollusca) of the Gulf of Mexico, Pp. 579–699 in: Felder, D.L. and D.K. Camp (eds.), Gulf of Mexico–Origins, Waters, and Biota. Texas A&M Press, College Station, Texas

Pisaniidae
Gastropods described in 1758
Taxa named by Carl Linnaeus